"Highway to Heaven" is a song by South Korean boy band NCT 127, the Seoul-based sub-unit of South Korean boy band NCT. It was released on May 14, 2019, by SM Entertainment, as a pre-release single 10 days before the release of the group's fourth EP, We Are Superhuman.

Background and release
The song was released as a pre-release single on May 14, 2019, alongside its music video.

The English version of "Highway to Heaven" was released on July 18.

Composition
According to Billboard's Tamar Herman, "Highway to Heaven" is a synth-pop ballad.

The song was written by Sean Machum, Michael Foster, Charles Anderson, Wilbart "Vedo" McCoy III, Richard Garcia and Gaelen Whitemor, and produced by Soo Man-Lee, Sean Machum, Gaelen Whitmore, Richard Garcia, Michael Foster, and Charles Anderson, (Social House) who produced Ariana Grande's "Thank U, Next" and "7 Rings".

English version 
The English version was released as a single on July 18 and on July 19 in South Korea.

Charts

Accolades

Release history

References

2019 songs
NCT 127 songs